Sara Martínez Bermell (born 16 September 2001) is a Spanish footballer who plays as a midfielder for Villarreal.

Club career
Bermell started her career at Levante C.

References

External links
Profile at La Liga

2001 births
Living people
Women's association football midfielders
Spanish women's footballers
People from Horta Sud
Sportspeople from the Province of Valencia
Footballers from the Valencian Community
Villarreal CF (women) players
Primera División (women) players
Segunda Federación (women) players
21st-century Spanish women